Wiatrowiec may refer to the following places:
Wiatrowiec, Greater Poland Voivodeship (west-central Poland)
Wiatrowiec, Masovian Voivodeship (east-central Poland)
Wiatrowiec, Warmian-Masurian Voivodeship (north Poland)